The qualification phase for the 2008 AFC Challenge Cup saw four teams advance to the finals to join four automatic qualifiers in the final tournament in India. Qualification was held from 2 April to 28 May 2008 in four different venues. Sixteen teams participated in qualification in four groups containing four teams each. The four group winners joined hosts India, North Korea, Myanmar, and Turkmenistan in the final round.

Seedings

5. 
6. 
7. 
8. 

9.  (Withdrew 14 May 2008)
10. 
11. 
12. 

13. 
14. 
15. 
16. 

17. 
18. 
19. 
20.  (Withdrew 2 May 2008)

The draw for the qualification groups was made on 18 January 2008 at AFC House in Kuala Lumpur, Malaysia.

Qualification

Group A
Matches played in Taipei, Chinese Taipei

Group B
Matches played in Iloilo City and Barotac Nuevo, Philippines

Group C
Matches played in Bishkek, Kyrgyzstan
Laos withdrew on 2 May.

Group D
Matches played in Phnom Penh, Cambodia
Palestine withdrew on 14 May.

Final tournament
The final tournament, consisting of 8 teams, was held from 30 July to 13 August 2008 in India.

Qualifiers
Qualifiers for the final tournament were:
  - automatic qualifier
  - automatic qualifier
  - automatic qualifier
  - automatic qualifier
  - Group A winner
  - Group B winner
  - Group C winner
  - Group D winner

Goalscorers

5 goals
 Kasun Jayasuriya

3 goals
 Ju Manu Rai
 Muhammad Qasim
 Channa Ediri Bandanage
 Numonjon Hakimov
 Yusuf Rabiev

2 goals
 Nuth Sinoun
 Chang Han
 Zachary Pangelinan
 Che Chi Man
 Jamshed Anwar
 Nimal Dehiwalage
 Chathura Maduranga Siyaguna

1 goal
 Ata Yamrali
 Mohamed Hasan Ameli
 Nawang Dendup
 Passang Tshering
 Khayrun Bin Salleh
 Chan Rithy
 Chen Po-liang
 Chiang Shih-lu
 Huang Wei-yi
 Lo Chih-an
 Tsai Hsien-tang
 Christopher Mendiola
 Roman Kornilov
 Ruslan Sydykov
 Chan Kin Seng
 Sandip Rai

1 goal
 Adnan Ahmed
 Tanveer Ahmed
 Mohammad Essa
 Zahid Hameed
 Michael Masih
 Abdul Rehman
 Farooq Shah
 Emelio Caligdong
 Chad Gould
 Phil Younghusband
 Sabras Mohamed
 Dzhomikhon Mukhidinov

Own goal
 Pema Rinchen (playing against Philippines)
 Chen Po-liang (playing against Sri Lanka)
 Iltaf Ahmed (playing against Guam)

References

External links
 AFC Website

qualification

fr:Qualifications de l'AFC Challenge Cup 2008